Epsom Girls Grammar School is a state secondary school for girls ranging from years 9 to 13 in Auckland, New Zealand. It had a roll of 2,200 as of 2012, including a number of boarders who live in nearby Epsom House, making it one of the largest schools in New Zealand.

The principal is Lorraine Pound, the 11th principal, who succeeded Madeline Gunn in 2016. She succeeds a long line of distinguished educators such as Margaret Bendall and Miss Adams.

Headmistresses/Principals
 Annie Christina Morrison 1917–1929
 Agnes L. Laudon 1930–1947
 Margaret G. Johnston 1948–1952
 Marjory F.E. Adams 1953–1970
 Alisa M. Blakey 1970–1979
 Gae E. Griffiths 1979–1988
 Verna E. Dowdle 1988–1996
 Margaret A. Bendall 1996–2004
 Annette Sharp 2005–2008
 Madeline J. Gunn 2008–2016
 Lorraine Pound 2016–present

Notable alumni

 Maggie Jenkins – New Zealand representative footballer 
 Petra Bagust – television presenter
 Helen Clark – 37th Prime Minister of New Zealand
 Miriam Dell – President, National Council of Women
 Rowena Jackson MBE – ballerina and later artistic director of the New Zealand Ballet Company
 Marya Martin – flautist
 Joan Metge – anthropologist
 Hannah O'Neill – principal ballerina at the Paris Opera Ballet
 Wilma Smith – lead violinist in the Melbourne Symphony Orchestra
 Freda Stark – dancer
 Olivia Tennet – actress, dancer
 Rima Te Wiata – comedian and actress
 Karen Walker – fashion designer
 Jean Spencer (born 1940), Olympic gymnast
 Lois White – artist
 Susan Moller Okin – feminist philosopher
 Annalie Longo – International and professional footballer
Taylor Flavell - Professional Squash Player
 Chlöe Swarbrick – Green Party MP.
Joan Chapple - first New Zealand female plastic surgeon

See also

 List of schools in New Zealand

References

Book of Memories: Epsom Girls Grammar School 1917–1992

Epsom Girls Grammar School golden jubilee 1917–1967

External links 
 School website
 Education Review Office 2006 Report

Educational institutions established in 1917
Boarding schools in New Zealand
Girls' schools in New Zealand
Secondary schools in Auckland
1917 establishments in New Zealand